Uranopilite is a minor ore of uranium with the chemistry (UO2)6SO4(OH)6O2·14H2O or, hydrated uranyl sulfate hydroxide.

As with many uranyl minerals, it is fluorescent and radioactive. It is straw yellow in normal light. Uranopilite fluoresces a bright green under ultraviolet light. Uranopilite contains clusters of six uranyl pentagonal bipyramids that share equatorial edges and vertices, with the clusters cross-linked to form chains by sharing vertices with sulfate tetrahedra. In uranopilite, the chains are linked directly by hydrogen bonds, as well as to interstitial H2O groups.

Uranopilite is associated with other uranyl minerals such as zippeite and johannite and, like them, is usually found as an efflorescent crust in uranium mines.

Notable occurrences include:

 Wheal Owles, Cornwall, England
 San Juan County, Utah, US
 Northwest Territories, Canada
 Bohemian region of Europe

See also 
 Uranyl sulfate
 List of minerals

References 

 Progress in Solid State Chemistry
 ATHENA MINERAL: Mineral Data

Uranium(VI) minerals
Sulfate minerals
Triclinic minerals
Minerals in space group 2